Miss Brittany is a French beauty pageant which selects a representative for the Miss France national competition from the region of Brittany. Women representing the region under various different titles have competed at Miss France since 1920, although the Miss Brittany title was not used regularly until 1981. Until 2010, women from the department of Loire-Atlantique were eligible to compete in Miss Brittany, due to the department's historical ties to the region despite currently being located within the region of Pays de la Loire.

The current Miss Brittany is Enora Moal, who was crowned Miss Brittany 2022 on 23 September 2022. Six women from Brittany have gone on to win Miss France.
Raymonde Allain, who was crowned Miss France 1928, competing as Miss Côte d'Émeraude
Jacqueline Janet, who was crowned Miss France 1937, competing as Miss Côte d'Émeraude
Brigitte Barazer de Lannurien, who was crowned Miss France 1960, competing as Miss Côte d'Émeraude
Michèle Wargnier, who was crowned Miss France 1961
Monique Lemaire, who was crowned Miss France 1962, competing as Miss Côte d'Émeraude
Laury Thilleman, who was crowned Miss France 2011

Results summary
Miss France: Raymonde Allain (1927; Miss Côte d'Émeraude); Jacqueline Janet (1936; Miss Côte d'Émeraude); Brigitte Barazer de Lannurien (1959; Miss Côte d'Émeraude); Michèle Wargnier (1960); Monique Lemaire (1961; Miss Côte d'Émeraude); Laury Thilleman (2010)
1st Runner-Up: Denise Le Brase (1920; Miss Côte d'Émeraude); Anita Treyens (1955); Monique Boulinguez (1957; Miss Côte d'Émeraude); Rolande Cozien (1968); Valérie Guenveur (1982); Christelle Mayet (1983)
2nd Runner-Up: Anne-Marie Poggi (1990); Mélanie Craignou (2009)
3rd Runner-Up: Marie-Laure Uzel (1978; Graziella Pequin (1987)
4th Runner-Up: Bianca Taillard (2008)
5th Runner-Up: Annie Cadiou (1970); Denise Kerfast (1971)
6th Runner-Up: Maurane Bouazza (2016)
Top 12/Top 15: Delphine André (1994); Florence Guillou (1999); Nathalie Economides (2003); Audrey Bonecker (2011); Estelle Sabathier (2012); Léa Bizeul (2015)

Titleholders

Miss Argoat
From 1977 to 1979, the inland area of Brittany, known as Argoat, competed separately.

Miss Côte d'Émeraude
Prior to the 1960s, the departments of Côtes d'Armor and Ille-et-Vilaine competed separately under the title Miss Côte d'Émeraude.

Miss Côte de Granit
In the 1970s, the department of Côtes d'Armor competed separately under the title Miss Côte de Granit.

Miss Finistère
In 1967, the department of Finistère crowned its own representative for Miss France.

Miss Morbihan
In 1964, the department of Morbihan crowned its own representative for Miss France. In 1979, the department competed under the title Miss Lorient.

Notes

References

External links

Miss France regional pageants
Beauty pageants in France
Women in France